Maureen Pitchfork (born 1934), is a female former swimmer and coach who competed for England.

Biography
In 1949 at age 14, the Mansfield Woodhouse schoolgirl gained one of 12 places offered by the English Amateur Swimming Association for a coaching programme aimed at the 1952 Olympic Games. She represented England in the 110 yards backstroke and the 330 yards medley relay at the 1954 British Empire and Commonwealth Games in Vancouver, Canada.

She was at one time the swimming coach of Rebecca Adlington.

Pitchfork also represented Great Britain at discus in 1962. She married Arthur Arnold and was known afterwards as Maureen Arnold.

References

1934 births
English female swimmers
Swimmers at the 1954 British Empire and Commonwealth Games
Living people
Commonwealth Games competitors for England